Tirak Deh, also rendered as Tiryak Deh, may refer to:
 Tirak Deh-e Olya
 Tirak Deh-e Sofla